Following the work of Pierre Larousse on the Grand dictionnaire Universel, the Grand Dictionnaire Encyclopédique Larousse, a ten-volume dictionary, was published between 1982 and 1985 by Éditions Larousse. It is an encyclopedia and a dictionary merged in a single alphabetical listing. Beneath the standard dictionary (meanings, usages) entry comes the encyclopedic section.

Articles are illustrated by photographs, maps, chronologies and diagrams.

French encyclopedias
French dictionaries
Éditions Larousse books
1982 non-fiction books
20th-century encyclopedias